Taşoz was one of the four s purchased by the Ottoman Empire from France in 1907. The ship served in the Ottoman Navy during the Italo-Turkish War, the Balkan Wars and World War I.

Design
Her hull was made of steel. Her crew, which consisted of 7 officers and 60 sailors when she was built in 1907, consisted of 74 Turks and 17 Germans by 1915 during World War I.

The ship was powered by two vertical triple-expansion steam engines, fed by steam from two water-tube boilers built by SA Chantiers et Ateliers de la Gironde. The ship could carry 60 tons of coal.

As built, the ship carried one Canon de 65 mm Modèle 1891 naval gun, six QF 3-pounder Hotchkiss guns and two 450 mm torpedo tubes.

Construction and purchase
At the turn of the 20th century, during a program to strengthen the Ottoman Navy, large quantities of cannons, ammunition and supplies were ordered from Krupp in 1904. In order to maintain diplomatic and financial balance, the Ottoman government decided to place subsequent orders with France. For this purpose, four Sultanhisar-class torpedo boats were ordered from Schneider-Creusot to meet the needs of the navy. As this small order was not sufficient for the French, the 200-ton s and the 420-ton Marmaris were also ordered. During negotiations in 1906, the French convinced the Ottoman government to purchase four more destroyers, which were ordered on 22 January 1906. Based on the French Durandal-class destroyers, Samsun, Yarhisar and Basra were built by Forges et Chantiers de la Gironde, while Taşoz was built by Schneider et Cie.

Operational history
Taşoz was commissioned into the Ottoman Navy on 1907 in Istanbul. The Ottoman fleet returned to defensive positions on October 12, with little activity until the end of the conflict.

During the First Balkan War, on December 12, 1912 Taşoz and Basra went on patrol in the waters of the Dardanelles, intending to ambush Greek destroyers, but had to return due to trouble with their boilers. Between 7 and 11 February 1913, Taşoz and Basra, together with the ironclad  took part in the unsuccessful descent at Podima on the Black Sea coast, losing Asar-i Tevfik in this action. In April and May, the Taşoz, together with the torpedo boat Berkefşan, escorted the transport ship Kizilirmak, sailing from Constanța to Istanbul.

At the outbreak of World War I, the destroyer was already obsolete and of low combat value. On 14–16 August 1914, Taşoz together with the cruiser  patrolled the Turkish straits. On 21 September, Taşoz and Basra escorted the battlecruiser  during a patrol cruise in the Black Sea. On the morning of 29 October, the Taşoz, together with her sister Samsun and the line cruiser Yavuz Sultan Selim, took part in an attack on the Russian harbour of Sevastopol, which was carried out without a formal declaration of war. After the attack, both destroyers participated in the rescue of sailors from the scuttled Russian minesweeper , taking on board a total of 75 survivors.

In 1915, her depleted engine room reduced her top speed to 17 knots, and the crew size increased to 91 men(17 Germans and 74 Turks). On the night of 2/3 April, the team arrived at Odessa and the destroyers started trawling. On 3 April, at 4 a.m. Taşoz and Samsun were damaged, and at 6:40, 16 nautical miles from the Vorontsov Lighthouse, the cruiser Mecidiye struck a mine, suffering such heavy damage, that after taking out its crew and destroying its armament and radio station, it was scuttled by a torpedo fired by Yâdigâr-ı Millet. The operation was aborted and the ships returned to base on 4 April.

Prior to the attack by Entente forces on Gallipoli Taşoz, together with her sister ships, escorted transports of Ottoman troops organised to reinforce the forces defending the Dardanelles. On 3 August 1915, the cruiser Hamidiye and the destroyers Taşoz, Muâvenet-i Milliye and  escorted a convoy consisting of the ships Zonguldak, Eresos, Illiria and Seyhun to the port of Zonguldak.

On 28 October 1916, Taşoz transported a group of German officers to Constanta to supervise the establishment of a naval base for Central Power ships there. 

On 22 January 1918, Taşoz and Numûne-i Hamiyet and the torpedo boat  were based in Çanakkale, tasked with protecting the damaged battlecruiser Yavuz Sultan Selim from attack by enemy submarines. On 30 March, Taşoz, Samsun and Basra escorted the German transport ship Patmos, carrying soldiers from Constanta to Odessa. In October, the ship was put in reserve in Istanbul.

After the end of the war, on 29 October 1923, Taşoz was incorporated into the newly formed Turkish Navy Between 1924 and 1925, the vessel underwent an overhaul at Deniz Fabrikaları in Istanbul and after its completion, entered active service. The ship was withdrawn from the fleet in 1932, following the purchase of newer Italian destroyers. The destroyer was scrapped only in 1949 at Gölcük.

Footnotes

References
 
 
 
 

World War I naval ships of the Ottoman Empire
1907 ships